Douglas Jay Loeffler (born May 14, 1932) is a politician in the American state of Florida. He served in the Florida House of Representatives from 1961 to 1964, representing Pinellas County.

References

1932 births
Living people
Members of the Florida House of Representatives